Christian Süß (born 28 July 1985 in Ahlen, North Rhine-Westphalia) is a German table tennis player.

At the 2008 Summer Olympics in Beijing, Süß won the silver medal as part of the German men's team, together with Timo Boll and Dimitrij Ovtcharov.

References

External links
 Christian-Suess.de, official website
 
 
 

1985 births
Living people
People from Ahlen
Sportspeople from Münster (region)
German male table tennis players
Olympic table tennis players of Germany
Olympic silver medalists for Germany
Table tennis players at the 2008 Summer Olympics
Olympic medalists in table tennis
Medalists at the 2008 Summer Olympics